This list of the amphibians of Greece is primarily based on the Atlas of the Amphibians and Reptiles of Greece (2020), published under the auspices of the Societas Hellenica Herpetologica, supplemented by the IUCN Red List. Of the 24 (IUCN) or 25 (Atlas) species recognized, three are endemic (Karpathos frog, Cretan frog, Karpathos salamander), while one is assessed as critically endangered (Karpathos frog).

Six species in the Atlas are currently not recognized on the IUCN Red List ("NR" below), while five species for which there is an IUCN Red List assessment are not included in the Atlas (varying toad, Bufotes variabilis ; Balkan spadefoot, Pelobates balcanicus ; smooth newt, Lissotriton vulgaris ; Italian crested newt, Triturus carnifex ; southern crested newt, Triturus karelinii ).

Order: Anura (frogs) 

Family: Bombinatoridae
Genus: Bombina
European fire-bellied toad, Bombina bombina 
Yellow-bellied toad, Bombina variegata 
Family: Bufonidae
Genus: Bufo
Common toad, Bufo bufo 
Genus: Bufotes
European green toad, Bufotes viridis 
Family: Hylidae
Genus: Hyla
European tree frog, Hyla arborea 
Eastern tree frog, Hyla orientalis (NR)
Family: Pelobatidae
Genus: Pelobates
Syrian spadefoot, Pelobates syriacus (NR)
Family: Ranidae
Genus: Lithobates
American bullfrog, Lithobates catesbeianus (introduced)
Genus: Pelophylax
Levant water frog, Pelophylax bedriagae 
Karpathos frog, Pelophylax cerigensis (endemic)
Cretan frog, Pelophylax cretensis (endemic)
Epirus water frog, Pelophylax epeiroticus 
Balkan water frog, Pelophylax kurtmuelleri 
Marsh frog, Pelophylax ridibundus 
Genus: Rana
Agile frog, Rana dalmatina 
Greek stream frog, Rana graeca 
Common frog, Rana temporaria

Order: Caudata (salamanders) 

Family: Salamandridae
Genus: Ichthyosaura
Alpine newt, Ichthyosaura alpestris 
Genus: Lissotriton
Greek smooth newt, Lissotriton graecus (NR)
Schmidtler's smooth newt, Lissotriton schmidtleri (NR)
Genus: Lyciasalamandra
Karpathos salamander, Lyciasalamandra helverseni (endemic)
Lycian salamander, Lyciasalamandra luschani 
Genus: Salamandra
Common fire salamander, Salamandra salamandra 
Genus: Triturus
Balkan crested newt, Triturus ivanbureschi (NR)
Macedonian crested newt, Triturus macedonicus (NR)

See also

 List of mammals of Greece
 List of birds of Greece
 List of freshwater fishes of Greece

References

External links
 Societas Hellenica Herpetologica

amphibians
Greece
Greece